B87 may refer to :
 Sicilian Defence, Scheveningen Variation, Encyclopaedia of Chess Openings code
 Myiasis, according to the ICD-10 codes list
 Bundesstraße 87, a German road
 Weißensee Straße, an Austrian road
 Kidman Way, route B87 connecting the Riverina with Bourke in NSW, Australia